Sebezhsky (masculine), Sebezhskaya (feminine), or Sebezhskoye (neuter) may refer to:
Sebezhsky District, a district of Pskov Oblast, Russia
Sebezhskoye, a rural locality (a settlement) in Kaliningrad Oblast, Russia